The Minnesota Dance Theatre (MDT) dance company and school in Minneapolis, Minnesota was founded by Loyce Houlton in 1962 as the Contemporary Dance Playhouse. It was renamed the Minnesota Dance Theatre in 1969. Lise Houlton succeeded her mother as artistic director in 1995. Each holiday season MDT presents the ballet Loyce Houlton's Nutcracker Fantasy based on Tchaikovsky's The Nutcracker. Ballet Arts Minnesota and the company's school joined in 2006 to become The Dance Institute. The organization is based in the Cowles Center for Dance and the Performing Arts.

Prince was a student at the Minnesota Dance Theatre through the Urban Arts Program of the Minneapolis Public Schools.

In 2012 as part of their 50th Anniversary season, MDT produced an updated version of their once controversial Carmina Burana, in collaboration with Dominique Serrand, of the former Theatre de la Jeune Lune.

Minnesota Dance Theatre offers classes for students and adults. The school has two divisions, the Young Childrens Division (YCD) and the Performing Arts Division (PAD). Both divisions have performance opportunities including Loyce Houlton's Nutcracker Fantasy and Strawberry Festival: a Student Showcase. MDT offers ballet fundamentals, beginning ballet, intermediate ballet, and advanced professional ballet classes, making it possible for somebody at any level to take a class.

Notes

External links

Minnesota Dance Theatre & The Dance Institute

Dance companies in the United States
Dance in Minnesota
Arts organizations based in Minneapolis
Culture of Minneapolis
Theatre companies in Minneapolis
Arts organizations established in 1962
1962 establishments in Minnesota